Robert "Big Bob" Isbister Sr. (June 9, 1885 – April 29, 1963) was a star football player in  the Ontario Rugby Football Union 1905-1906 and then in the Big Four (IRFU) 1907-1915, 1919 for twelve seasons for the Hamilton Tigers. After retiring, he was a referee.

Isbister was born in Hamilton, Ontario, and died in Hamilton, Ontario.  He was inducted into the Canadian Football Hall of Fame in 1965 and into the Canada's Sports Hall of Fame in 1975.

His son Bob Isbister Jr. was also an all-star Grey Cup champion Canadian football player, with the Toronto Argonauts.

References
 Canada's Sports Hall of Fame profile

Sportspeople from Hamilton, Ontario 
Players of Canadian football from Ontario
Hamilton Tigers football players
Canadian Football Hall of Fame inductees
Canadian football officials
1885 births
1963 deaths